Our Lady of Good Voyage is a title of the Blessed Virgin Mary. It originated in seafaring communities of Portugal and Spain. The devotion spread as sailors traveled the world.

Background
The devotion to Mary under this title began in Ericeira, Portugal. There, on August 15th each year, the feast of the Assumption of Mary, the fishing fleet is blessed and a procession of boats takes place. 

In 1889, the first church dedicated to Our Lady of Good Voyage in the United States opened in Gloucester, Massachusetts. It was opened after a large number of Portuguese immigrants moved to Gloucester to work in the fishing industry. There is also the Seaport Shrine, a chapel in Boston's Seaport District, dedicated to Our Lady of Good Voyage. In the Archdiocese of Belo Horizonte in Brazil, the cathedral is the Our Lady of Good Voyage Cathedral.

Statues of Our Lady of Good Voyage show the Virgin Mary holding Jesus in one arm and a ship in the other.

References

Titles of Mary
Mary, mother of Jesus
Christianity in Portugal